Anthony Joshua vs Gary Cornish, billed as Heavy Duty, was a heavyweight professional boxing match contested between undefeated WBC International champion Anthony Joshua, and undefeated IBO Inter-Continental champion Gary Cornish, with Joshua's WBC International, and the vacant Commonwealth titles on the line. The bout took place on 12 September 2015 at The O2 Arena in London, England. Joshua defeated Cornish, adding the Commonwealth title to his WBC International title via first-round technical knockout (TKO).

Background
Both fighters last fought in May 2015; Cornish scoring a fourth-round TKO win over Zoltan Csala to capture the IBO Inter-Continental title and Joshua scoring a second-round TKO over former world title challenger Kevin Johnson–the first stoppage loss of Johnson's career–to retain his WBC International title. 

After Lucas Browne relinquished the Commonwealth title in order to face WBA (Regular) champion Ruslan Chagaev, the Commonwealth Boxing Council ordered Joshua vs. Cornish for the vacant title, with the fight scheduled to take place on 12 September at The O2 Arena in London, live on Sky Sports.

The Fight

With both men showing intent to fight from the opening bell, Joshua landed a solid right hand a little under a minute into the fight, dropping the Scottish challenger to the canvas. Cornish made it to his feet before the referee's count of ten, only to be met by a sustained attack from Joshua. On the receiving end of another right hand, Cornish was down for a second time halfway through the round. He again made it to his feet just before the count of ten on unsteady legs, prompting referee Victor Loughlin to wave off the fight, giving Joshua his first major regional title via first-round TKO. Immediately after the fight, promoter Eddie Hearn revealed a deal was in place for Joshua to take on undefeated rival Dillian Whyte.

Fight card

See also
List of Commonwealth boxing champions

References

2015 in boxing
2015 in British sport
September 2015 sports events in the United Kingdom
2015 sports events in London
Boxing matches involving Anthony Joshua